Damián Hugo Quintero Capdevila (born 4 July 1984) is a Spanish karateka. He won the silver medal in the men's kata event at the 2020 Summer Olympics in Tokyo, Japan. He is also a three-time silver medalist in the individual kata event at the World Championships, a six-time gold medalist in his event at the European Championships and a two-time gold medalist in this event at the European Games.

Born in Buenos Aires, he emigrated with his family to Torremolinos, Malaga, Spain a few years later.

Career 

In 2017, he won the silver medal in the individual kata event at the World Games held in Wrocław, Poland.

In 2019, he won the gold medal in the men's individual kata event at the European Games held in Minsk, Belarus. In the same year, he won the gold medal in the men's kata event at the European Karate Championships held in Guadalajara, Spain. In the same year, he also won the gold medal in the men's individual kata event at the World Beach Games held in Doha, Qatar.

He represented Spain at the 2020 Summer Olympics in Tokyo, Japan. He won the silver medal in the men's kata event. A few months after the Olympics, he won the silver medal in the men's kata event at the 2021 World Karate Championships held in Dubai, United Arab Emirates.

He won the silver medal in the men's kata event at the 2022 World Games held in Birmingham, United States.

Achievements

References

External links 

 
 

1984 births
Living people
Spanish male karateka
Karateka at the 2015 European Games
Karateka at the 2019 European Games
World Games medalists in karate
World Games silver medalists
Competitors at the 2017 World Games
Competitors at the 2022 World Games
European Games gold medalists for Spain
European Games medalists in karate
Sportspeople from Buenos Aires
Argentine emigrants to Spain
Karateka at the 2020 Summer Olympics
Olympic medalists in karate
Medalists at the 2020 Summer Olympics
Olympic silver medalists for Spain
Olympic karateka of Spain
21st-century Spanish people